Edmondson is a patronymic surname meaning "son of Edmond".  There are varied spellings, including Edmonson.  It is uncommon as a given name.  Notable people with the surname Edmondson include:

 Ade Edmondson (born 1957), British comedian, actor, writer, musician, television presenter and director
 Beattie Edmondson (born 1987), English actress
 David Edmondson
 Donna Edmondson
 Douglas Edmondson
 Drew Edmondson
 Ed Edmondson (chess official)
 Ed Edmondson (U.S. politician)
 Ella Edmondson (born 1986), English musician
 Frank K. Edmondson (1912–2008), American astronomer
 G. C. Edmondson, working name of science fiction author Garry Edmonson (1922–1995)
 J. Howard Edmondson
 James E. Edmondson
 Jerold A. Edmondson, Professor Emeritus of Linguistics at the University of Texas at Arlington
 John Hurst Edmondson
 Joseph Edmondson (died 1786), English herald and genealogist 
 Mark Edmondson
 Mark Edmondson (rugby league footballer)
 Matt Edmondson (born 1985), British television and radio presenter
 Paul Edmondson
 Ryan Edmondson, English footballer
 Thomas Edmondson (born c. 1645), Burgess - Virginia House of Burgesses 1693 et al. 
 Thomas William Edmondson (1869–1938), Anglo-American mathematician
 Thomas Edmondson, inventor of the Edmondson railway ticket
 Van Edmondson (1899–1998), American football player
 Walles T. Edmondson ("Tommy") limnologist at University of Washington
 William Edmondson (disambiguation), multiple people
 Yvette Hardman Edmondson, scientist and former editor of Limnology and Oceanography

See also
 Edmondston, a surname
 Edmundson (disambiguation)
 Edmonds (disambiguation)

English-language surnames
Patronymic surnames
Surnames from given names